Sicario may refer to:

 Sicario (1994 film), a Venezuelan drama film by Joseph Novoa
 Sicario (2015 film), an American crime film by Denis Villeneuve
 Sicario: Day of the Soldado (2018; titled Sicario 2: Soldado in the UK), an American crime film by Stefano Sollima, sequel to Villeneuve's 2015 film
 Sicario (album), a 2005 thrash metal album by Criminal
 "Sicario", a 2005 song by Criminal off the eponymous album

See also 

 
 Sicarii
 Sicarius (disambiguation)